In number theory, the Dedekind psi function is the multiplicative function on the positive integers defined by

where the product is taken over all primes  dividing  (By convention, which is the empty product, has value 1.) The function was introduced by Richard Dedekind in connection with modular functions.

1, 3, 4, 6, 6, 12, 8, 12, 12, 18, 12, 24, ... .

If  is a square-free number then , where  is the divisor function.

The  function can also be defined by setting  for powers of any prime , and then extending the definition to all integers by multiplicativity. This also leads to a proof of the generating function in terms of the Riemann zeta function, which is

There is an additive definition of the psi function as well. Quoting from Dickson,

R. Dedekind proved that, if  is decomposed in every way into a product  and if  is the g.c.d. of  then
 

Higher orders
The generalization to higher orders via ratios of Jordan's totient is

with Dirichlet series

.

It is also the Dirichlet convolution of a power and the square
of the Möbius function,

.

If

is the characteristic function of the squares, another Dirichlet convolution
leads to the generalized σ-function,

.

References

External links

See also
  (page 25, equation (1))
  Section 3.13.2

Multiplicative functions